Mark W. Walker was a member of the Utah House of Representatives from Sandy and a candidate in the Republican primary for State Treasurer along with Republican Richard Ellis, Chief Deputy State Treasurer.  Ellis claimed that Walker suggested he should drop out of the race and in return, Walker (if elected) would keep Ellis on with a $56,000 pay raise.  During an Ethics Committee Investigation, Walker pled guilty to "inducement not to become a candidate," agreed not to run, perform 100 hours of Community Service and fined.  Walker then resigned his position. (2008)

References

Members of the Utah House of Representatives
Living people
Year of birth missing (living people)
Place of birth missing (living people)
21st-century American politicians
Utah politicians convicted of crimes